The southern little yellow-eared bat (Vampyressa pusilla) is a frugivorous bat species found in Brazil, Argentina and Paraguay.

References

Bats of South America
Bats of Brazil
Bats of Central America
Vampyressa
Mammals described in 1843